Israel–Palau relations are the bilateral relations between the State of Israel and the Republic of Palau.

Israel was the first non-Pacific nation to declare diplomatic relations with Palau at its independence in 1994. Israel favored Palau's admission into the United Nations and offered economic aid to the young state. The Israeli Foreign Ministry has sent convoys of agricultural and fishing experts to Palau to help in training the local population. Israel maintains an honorary consulate in Koror.

As of 2006, Palau had the highest voting coincidence with Israel in the United Nations.

In 2006, President of Palau Thomas Remengesau Jr. visited Israel and held meetings with the Israeli Prime Minister Ehud Olmert and President Moshe Katsav.  "We're the best of friends and we're here to reiterate that friendship", Remengesau said during the visit.

In December 2017, Palau was one of nine countries (including the United States and Israel) to vote against a motion adopted by the United Nations General Assembly condemning the United States' recognition of Jerusalem as the capital of Israel.

See also

 History of the Jews in Palau

References

Palau
Bilateral relations of Palau